The Handball events at the 2002 Asian Games were held in South Korea between 30 September and 13 October 2002. The competition took place at the Changwon Gymnasium.

Schedule

Medalists

Medal table

Draw
The teams were seeded based on their final ranking at the 1998 Asian Games. The women were played in round robin format.

Group A
 (1)
 (3)
 (6)

Group B
 (2)
 (5)
 (7)

*

* Withdrew.

Final standing

Men

Women

References
 www.busanasiangames.org
 www.handball.jp

External links
 Asian Handball Federation

 
2002 Asian Games events
2002
Asian Games
2002 Asian Games